Prosoplus oblitus is a species of beetle in the family Cerambycidae. It was described by Francis Polkinghorne Pascoe in 1863. It is known from Australia.

References

Prosoplus
Beetles described in 1863